Robert John Kuechenberg (October 14, 1947 – January 12, 2019) was a guard in the National Football League (NFL) for the Miami Dolphins for 14 seasons between 1970 and 1983, spending the 1984 season on injured reserve. He was a mainstay in a line that included Hall of Famers Jim Langer, Larry Little, and Dwight Stephenson and played in six Pro Bowls in the late 1970s and early 1980s. He was selected as one of the top 15 finalists for the Pro Football Hall of Fame from 2002 to 2006, and one of the top 17 finalists from 2007 to 2009, but missed the cut every year. He was inducted into the Miami Dolphin's Honor Roll on December 15, 1995. He was the brother of the retired Chicago Bears linebacker Rudy Kuechenberg.

College career
Kuechenberg attended college at the University of Notre Dame, where he played both the offensive and defensive lines.
Before college Kuechenberg attended Hobart High School, located in Hobart, Indiana 10 minutes from Gary, and 30 minutes from Chicago. Kuechenberg played football for the Hobart Brickies in his high school years.

Professional career
Kuechenberg was drafted by the Philadelphia Eagles as a fourth-round pick in the 1969 NFL Draft. He quit shortly after training camp started and played a season with the Chicago Owls in the Continental Football League. Kuechenberg signed with the Dolphins as a free agent in 1970. He became a starter that season as the Dolphins finished 10–4 and made the playoffs for the first time in club history. During the next regular season, 1971, Kuechenberg helped the Dolphins make it to the Super Bowl, where they lost to the Dallas Cowboys 24–3.

The next two seasons the Dolphins won the Super Bowl (going 17–0 in 1972) and his play was noticed by New York Post writer Paul Zimmerman, who named Kuechenberg on his All-pro ballot. The following season, 1974, he was named All-AFC by Pro Football Weekly and was named to his first Pro Bowl. He was named 1st team All-Pro in 1975 and in 1978 and was named All-AFC three times. He was Second-team All-Pro in 1977.

Kuechenberg was sometimes critical of his past teams.  One such critique prompted then-current Miami All-Pro, Jason Taylor, to comment, "It's another chapter in the grumpy Kuechenberg story. It's Kuechenberg. He gets up every year and complains about something. If it ain't one thing, it's another. He needs a hug and a hobby. It's ridiculous."

Kuechenberg was inducted into the American Football Association's Semi Pro Football Hall of Fame in 1986. In 2013, President Barack Obama honored the entire 1972 Perfect Season Dolphins at an event in the White House, but Kuechenberg declined to attend for political reasons.  He told sports columnist Dave Hyde of Ft. Lauderdale's Sun-Sentinel "I want to be careful, because Mom said if you have nothing good to say about someone, then don't say anything. I don't have anything good to say about someone."  The Professional Football Researchers Association named Kuechenberg to the PRFA Hall of Very Good Class of 2013

References

External links
Pro Football Hall of Fame Finalist
American Football Association

1947 births
2019 deaths
American Conference Pro Bowl players
American football offensive guards
Miami Dolphins players
National Football League announcers
Notre Dame Fighting Irish football players
Philadelphia Eagles players
People from Hobart, Indiana
Players of American football from Gary, Indiana